is a Japanese anime film editor. He served as the Chief Editor for the anime adaptation of the visual novel Air.

Filmography
 .hack//Sign
 Air – Chief Editor
 Black Jack (1996) – Editor
 Code Geass
 Juliette, je t'aime
 La Corda d'Oro - Primo Passo – Editor
 Madlax
 Naruto
 Noir
 Planetes
 Ranma ½
 The Twelve Kingdoms
 You're Under Arrest

References

External links
 
 
 Seiji Morita anime at Media Arts Database 

Anime directors
Japanese film editors
Living people
Year of birth missing (living people)
Place of birth missing (living people)